The Serie B 1980–81 was the forty-ninth tournament of this competition played in Italy since its creation.

Teams
Varese, Rimini, Catania and Foggia had been promoted from Serie C, while Pescara, Milan and Lazio had been relegated from Serie A. Milan and Lazio had been relegated due to the 1980 Totonero scandal rather than performance in the league.

Final classification

Results

References and sources
Almanacco Illustrato del Calcio - La Storia 1898-2004, Panini Edizioni, Modena, September 2005

Serie B seasons
2
Italy